Limnebius truncatellus is a species of beetle belonging to the family Hydraenidae.

It is native to Europe.

References

Staphylinoidea